Anderson Jordan da Silva Cordeiro (born 22 April 1999), commonly known as Jordan, is a Brazilian footballer who plays as a central defender for Tombense, on loan from Cianorte.

Club career
Born in São Paulo, Jordan played for Corinthians and Ferroviária as a youth. He made his senior debut on 2 July 2017, coming on as a late substitute for Danilo Sacramento in a 2–1 Copa Paulista away win against Mirassol.

In 2018, Jordan moved to Cianorte, but was subsequently loaned to Corinthians in June of that year, and featured for their under-20 squad and their under-23 squad in the 2019 Copa Paulista. On 20 December 2019, he moved to Botafogo-SP also in a temporary deal.

Jordan was a regular starter for the Pantera during the campaign, as his club suffered relegation. On 17 February 2021, still owned by Cianorte, he joined Ceará until the end of the year.

Jordan made his Série A debut on 5 June 2021, replacing Gabriel Lacerda late into a 1–3 away loss against Santos.

Career statistics

References

External links
Ceará profile 

1999 births
Living people
Footballers from São Paulo
Brazilian footballers
Association football defenders
Campeonato Brasileiro Série A players
Campeonato Brasileiro Série B players
Associação Ferroviária de Esportes players
Cianorte Futebol Clube players
Sport Club Corinthians Paulista players
Botafogo Futebol Clube (SP) players
Ceará Sporting Club players
Associação Chapecoense de Futebol players